Charlie Severs (born 1 October 2003) is an English professional rugby league footballer who plays as a  forward for Hull F.C. in the Betfred Super League.

In 2022 he made his Hull début in the Super League against Hull Kingston Rovers.

References

External links
Hull FC profile

2003 births
Living people
English rugby league players
Hull F.C. players
Rugby league players from York